Google Code Jam is an international programming competition hosted and administered by Google. The competition began in 2003. The competition consists of a set of algorithmic problems which must be solved in a fixed amount of time. Competitors may use any programming language and development environment to obtain their solutions. From 2003 to 2007, Google Code Jam was deployed on Topcoder's platform. Since 2008 Google has developed their own dedicated infrastructure for the contest.

Between 2015 and 2018, Google also ran Distributed Code Jam, with the focus on distributed algorithms. This was run in parallel with the regular Code Jam, with its own qualification and final round, for a top prize of $10,000, but was only open for people who qualified to Round 2 of Code Jam (up to 3000 people).

Several Google Code Jam problems have led to academic research.

On February 22, 2023, Google announced that Google Code Jam will be discontinued alongside their other programming competitions, Hash Code and Kick Start. A series of four "farewell rounds" has been scheduled to take place on April 15, 2023 from 14:00 until 18:00 UTC, with all rounds taking place at the same time. The platform hosting Google's programming competitions will be shut down on July 1, 2023, with login functionality disabled one month prior, on June 1, 2023.

Past winners

Google Code Jam 

 The 2020 Code Jam World Final was originally scheduled to take place in Munich, Germany, but later was converted to online format in response to COVID-19 pandemic.

Distributed Code Jam

Results by country

See also 
 Google Code
 Online judge
 Topcoder Open

References 

 https://code.google.com/codejam/contest/7214486/scoreboard 
 https://code.google.com/codejam/contest/2437491/scoreboard?c=2437491

External links 
 Google – Code Jam

Code Jam
Programming contests